Greta Naterberg née Persdotter (June 10, 1772 in Nykil, Östergötland – May 10, 1818 in Slaka 1818) was a Swedish folk singer.

She was born to the soldier Per Callerman and Kerstin Lagesdotter and in 1800 she married the soldier Peter Hansson (who later changed his name to Naterberg). She had an extensive repertoire of songs and ballads, which has been documented by Leonhard Fredrik Rääf.

References
 http://nordicwomensliterature.net/writer/naterberg-greta
 Bengt R. Jonsson: Svensk Balladtradition, bd. 1, 1967
 Bengt R. Jonsson (red.): Sveriges medeltida ballader, 1983

Further reading  
  

1772 births
1818 deaths
Swedish folk singers
18th-century Swedish singers
19th-century Swedish singers
Gustavian era people